A self-regulatory organization (SRO) is an organization that exercises some degree of regulatory authority over an industry or profession. The regulatory authority could exist in place of government regulation, or applied in addition to government regulation.  The ability of an SRO to exercise regulatory authority does not necessarily derive from a grant of authority from the government.

United States 
In United States securities law, a self-regulatory organization is a defined term. The principal federal regulatory authority—the Securities and Exchange Commission (SEC)—was established by the Federal Securities Exchange Act of 1934.  The SEC originally delegated authority to the National Association of Securities Dealers (NASD, now Financial Industry Regulatory Authority (FINRA)) and to the national stock exchanges (e.g., the NYSE) to enforce certain industry standards and requirements related to securities trading and brokerage. On July 26, 2007 the SEC approved a merger of the enforcement arms of the NYSE and the NASD, to form a new SRO, the Financial Industry Regulatory Authority (FINRA).  In addition, Congress created the Municipal Securities Rulemaking Board (MSRB) as an SRO charged with adopting investor protection rules governing broker-dealers and banks that underwrite, trade and sell tax-exempt bonds, 529 college savings plans and other types of municipal securities.

Examples 
The American Arbitration Association is also an SRO with official, statutory status.

Because of the prominence of the SROs in the securities industry, the term SRO is often used to narrowly to describe an organization authorized by statute or government agency to exercise control over a certain aspect of the industry.

The National Association of Realtors (NAR) is an example of an SRO that fills the vacuum left by the absence of government oversight or regulation. The NAR sets the rules for multiple listing services and how brokers use them.  Another example is the American Medical Association which sets rules for ethics, conflicts, disciplinary action, and accreditation in medicine.

BBB National Programs is an example of an organization that houses multiple SROs, such as the Children's Advertising Review Unit, (CARU) and the National Advertising Division (NAD), formerly known as the Advertising Self-Regulatory Council, which is the U.S. advertising industry's self-regulatory body. In addition to setting guidelines, these programs provide third-party accountability and dispute resolution services to companies, outside and in-house counsel, consumers, and others in arenas such as privacy, advertising, data collection, child-directed marketing, and more.

Russia 
In 2007 Russia has adopted a law regulating SROs.

See also

Industry self-regulation
Securities market participants (United States)

References

Financial regulation

Professional ethics
Self-regulatory organizations in the United States